Spirostyliferina wareni is a species of sea snail, a marine gastropod mollusk in the family Spirostyliferinidae.

References

External links
 Moolenbeek R.G. 2009. Hoenselaaria, a new genus with the description of a new species (Gastropoda: Eulimidae) from the Indo-Pacific. Miscellanea Malacologica 3(4) : 71-75
 Layton, K. K. S.; Middelfart, P. U.; Tatarnic, N. J.; Wilson, N. G. (2019). Erecting a new family for Spirostyliferina, a truncatelloidean microgastropod, and further insights into truncatelloidean phylogeny. Zoologica Scripta

Truncatelloidea
Gastropods described in 2009